Shuanghe Station is a station on Line 7 of the Beijing Subway.

Station layout 
The station has underground dual-island platforms with a track in the middle.

Exits 
There are 4 exits, lettered A, B, C, and D. Exit B is accessible.

References

Railway stations in China opened in 2014
Beijing Subway stations in Chaoyang District